Wilhelm Tomaschek, or Vilém Tomášek (May 26, 1841, Olomouc – September 9, 1901, Vienna) was a Czech-Austrian geographer and orientalist. He is known for his work in the fields of historical topography and historical ethnography.

Born at Olmütz, in Moravia, he received his education at the University of Vienna (1860–64), afterwards working as a teacher in gymnasiums at Sankt Pölten and Vienna. On the strength of the first volume of Centralasiatische Studien, he was named an associate professor of geography at the University of Graz in 1877. In 1881 he attained the rank of full professor, and in 1885, was appointed chair of historical geography at the University of Vienna. In 1899 he became a regular member of the Vienna Academy of Sciences.

In 1933 the thoroughfare Tomaschekstraße, in the district of Floridsdorf (Vienna), was named in his honor.

Literary works 
 Centralasiatische Studien. I. Sogdiana, 1877 – Central Asian studies; Sogdiana.
 Centralasiatische Studien. II. Die Pamir-Dialekte, 1880 – Central Asian studies; Pamir dialects.
 Zur historischen Topographie von Persien. I. Die Straßenzüge der tabula Peutingeriana, 1883 –  Historical topography of Persia, The streets of Tabula Peutingeriana.
 Zur historischen Topographie von Persien. II. Die Wege durch die Persische Wüste, 1885 –  Historical topography of Persia. II. Routes through the Persian desert. 
 Zur historischen Topographie von Kleinasien im Mittelalter, 1891 – Historical topography of Asia Minor in the Middle Ages.
 Die alten Thraker. Eine ethnologische Untersuchung. 3 volumes. Vienna: Tempsky, 1893–1894 – The ancient Thracians. An ethnographic study.

References

External links
 

1841 births
1901 deaths
Austrian geographers
19th-century Austrian historians
Writers from Olomouc
Austrian orientalists
Historians of geography
Thracologists
University of Vienna alumni
Academic staff of the University of Graz